Helmut Maurer (born 7 November 1945) is an Austrian retired footballer and coach.

References

External links
 Rapid Archiv
 Sturm Archiv

1945 births
Living people
Austrian footballers
Austria international footballers
Association football goalkeepers
Austrian Football Bundesliga players
SV Wienerberger players
1. Simmeringer SC players
SK Rapid Wien players
Austrian football managers
First Vienna FC managers